Ahan Sar (also Romanized as Āhan Sar; also known as Āfensar and Ākhen Sar) is a village in Larijan-e Sofla Rural District, Larijan District, Amol County, Mazandaran Province, Iran. At the 2006 census, its population was 80, in 27 families.

References 

Populated places in Amol County